Club Sportif Pétange is a former football club, based in Pétange, in south-western Luxembourg. In 2015 it folded and merged with FC Titus Lamadelaine to form Union Titus Pétange.

In the 2007–08 season, Pétange finished fourteenth and last in the National Division and were relegated to the Division of Honour. In 2008/09 the club finished top of the Luxembourg Division of Honour and immediately returned to the National Division. They, however, were again relegated at the end of the 2012–13 season. This was their sixth relegation from the top tier in just over 25 years.

Honours

Luxembourg Cup
Winners (1): 2004–05
Runners-up (1): 1991–92

European Competition

Pétange have qualified for UEFA European competition once.

UEFA Cup
Qualifying round (1): 2005–06

Pétange's only tie in European competition was against AC Allianssi of Finland in the 2005–06 UEFA Cup.  Despite a respectable 1–1 draw at home, Pétange was eliminated 4–1 on aggregate.

Overall, Pétange's record in European competition reads:

Managers
 Manuel Peixoto (July 2004 – July 7)
 Florim Alijaj (Sept 2007 – June 8)
 Carlo Weis (July 2008 – Nov 11)
 Michel Leflochmoan (Nov 2011 – June 12)
 Michel Renquin (Jan 2012 – Aug 12)
 Paulo Gomes (Oct 2012–)

External links
 CS Pétange official website

 
Pétange
Association football clubs established in 1910
1910 establishments in Luxembourg
Association football clubs disestablished in 2015
2015 disestablishments in Luxembourg
Defunct football clubs in Luxembourg